Hanna Pettersson (born 10 November 1987) is a Swedish football striker currently playing for Piteå IF in Sweden's Damallsvenskan. She previously played for Stattena IF, KIF Örebro DFF and Umeå IK.

In April 2010 Pettersson scored twice on her Umeå debut, a 3–2 UEFA Women's Champions League semi final defeat away to Lyon.

In May 2013 she suffered an anterior cruciate ligament injury while playing for Piteå.

References

External links
 

1987 births
Living people
Swedish women's footballers
Damallsvenskan players
KIF Örebro DFF players
Piteå IF (women) players
Umeå IK players
Women's association football forwards